Louis-Jean-Baptiste-Joseph Julliard (13 March 1912 – 13 February 1984) was a French clergyman and bishop for the Roman Catholic Diocese of Port-Vila. He became ordained in 1936. Julliard was born in Coubon. He was appointed bishop in 1955. He died on 13 February 1984.

References 

French Roman Catholic bishops in Oceania
1912 births
1984 deaths
20th-century French Roman Catholic bishops
People from Haute-Loire
Roman Catholic bishops of Port-Vila